Vsesvit (Vsesvit) is a Ukrainian periodical that publishes exclusive translations of world classics and contemporary works of literature, covers different aspects of cultural, artistic, social, and political life in all parts of the world.  The Ukrainian word Vsesvit translates as the Universe.

Vsesvit monthly is the oldest and the most recognized Ukrainian literary journal. It was founded in 1925 by the prominent Ukrainian writers - Vasyl Ellan-Blakytnyi, Mykola Khvyliovyi and Alexander Dovzhenko. More than 500 novels, 1,000 poems, short stories, and plays as well as hundreds of essays, reviews, interviews with prominent writers from more than a hundred countries were translated from more than 84 different languages and published in Vsesvit during its existence.

Ars Translationis, a prestigious literary prize to commemorate famous Ukrainian translator Mykola Lukash, was established by the periodical in 1995. It has been conferred on the best literary translators into the Ukrainian regularly.

Vsesvit has often been the first to introduce the best in global writing in Ukrainian translations. For a number of generations living in the Soviet Union the journal was a kind of opening and served as a regular link to the "outer world", a break through the iron curtain as it were. Vsesvit also gave rise to a school of Ukrainian translators and scholars known in Ukraine and abroad.

External links
 Official web site of Vsesvit, the journal

1925 establishments in the Soviet Union
Magazines established in 1925
Monthly magazines
Literary magazines published in the Soviet Union
Ukrainian literature
Literary magazines published in Ukraine
Ukrainian-language magazines